Lambda Aurigae, Latinized from λ Aurigae, is the Bayer designation for a solar analog star in the northern constellation of Auriga. It is visible to the naked eye with an apparent visual magnitude of 4.71. Based upon parallax measurements, it is approximately  distant from the Earth. The star is drifting further away with a high radial velocity of +66.5 km/s, having come to within  some 117,300 years ago.

Properties
This is a G-type main sequence star with a stellar classification of G1 V. It is sometimes listed with a class of G1.5 IV-V Fe-1, which indicates the spectrum is showing some features of a more evolved subgiant star along with a noticeable underabundance of iron. In terms of composition it is similar to the Sun, while the mass and radius are slightly larger. At this heat, the star glows with the yellow hue of a G-type star. It has a low level of surface activity and is a candidate Maunder minimum analog.

Lambda Aurigae has been examined for the presence of excess infrared emission that may indicate the presence of a circumstellar disk of dust, but no significant surplus has been observed. It is a possible member of the Epsilon Indi Moving Group of stars that share a common motion through space. The space velocity components of this star are  = .

Name
This star may have been called by the name Al Hurr, meaning the fawn in Arabic. Lambda Aurigae, along with μ Aur and ρ Aur, were Kazwini's Al Ḣibāʽ (ألحباع), the Tent. According to the catalogue of stars in the Technical Memorandum 33-507 - A Reduced Star Catalog Containing 537 Named Stars, Al Ḣibāʽ were the title for three stars : λ Aur as Al Ḣibāʽ I, μ Aur as Al Ḣibāʽ II and σ Aur as Al Ḣibāʽ III.

Observation
From Earth, Lambda Aurigae has an apparent magnitude of 4.71. Hypothetically viewed from Lambda Aurigae, Capella's quadruple star system would have an apparent magnitude of approximately -5.48, about 40 times brighter than Sirius can be seen at maximum brightness from Earth.

References

External links
 Image Lambda Aurigae

G-type main-sequence stars
G-type subgiants
Aurigae, Lambda
Maunder Minimum

Auriga (constellation)
Aurigae, Lambda
BD+39 1248
Aurigae, 15
0197
034411
024813
1729